Moussa Dembélé (born 30 October 1988 in Guédiawaye) is a Senegalese athlete competing in the sprint hurdles. He represented his country at the 2012 Summer Olympics but was disqualified after falling at the 8th hurdle.

His personal bests are 13.70 seconds in the 110 metres hurdles (+1.5 m/s, New York City 2013) and 7.75 seconds in the 60 metres hurdles (Hampton 2013).

Competition record

1Did not finish in the final

References

Senegalese male hurdlers
1988 births
Living people
Olympic athletes of Senegal
Athletes (track and field) at the 2012 Summer Olympics
People from Dakar Region
Athletes (track and field) at the 2011 All-Africa Games
African Games competitors for Senegal